Mark Fellows may refer to:
Mark Fellows (American football) (born 1963), retired American football linebacker
Mark Fellows (hitman) (born 1980), English convicted murderer